is a 1995 Japanese film directed by Kei Kumai. It is based on the novel of the same name by Shusaku Endo. The film version was chosen as Japan's official submission to the 68th Academy Awards for Best Foreign Language Film, but did not manage to receive a nomination. It also marked the final film appearance of legendary Japanese actor Toshiro Mifune before his death in 1997.

The film has yet to see an NTSC home media release, nor even one with an English translation.

See also
 List of submissions to the 68th Academy Awards for Best Foreign Language Film
 List of Japanese submissions for the Academy Award for Best Foreign Language Film

References

External links

1995 films
1990s Japanese-language films
1995 drama films
Films based on works by Shūsaku Endō
Films directed by Kei Kumai
Japanese drama films
1990s Japanese films